Impossible on Saturday (lit. "No question Saturday") is a 1965 Italian-French-Israeli comedy film co-production directed by Alex Joffé.

Cast
Robert Hirsch as Carlo, plus 11 other roles
Dalia Friedland as Deborah
Mia Asherov as Yankel Silberschatz
Teddy Bilisas Tulipman
Avner Hizkiyahu as M. Meyer
Geula Nuni as Aviva
Yona Levy as Esther
Rina Ganor		
Bomba Tzur as Le capitaine du bateau
Rachel Attas as Léa
Yael Aviv
Ya'ackov Bodo
Shmuel Rodensky
Shmuel Segal

External links
 

1965 comedy films
1965 films
French comedy films
Israeli comedy films
Italian comedy films
1960s Italian-language films
1960s Italian films
1960s French films